Tré may refer to: 

Tré Cool, drummer for the American band Green Day
¡Tré!, the eleventh studio album by the same band.
Tré, Benin, a town and arrondissement in the Collines department of Benin